Danny McCray (born March 11, 1974) is an American former athlete who competed in sprinting events.

McCray, a Texas state championship winner at Ellison High School, ran for Texas A&M and was a six-time NCAA All-American. He was an NCAA champion in the 4 x 100 metres and made the 400 metres final of the 1997 Summer Universiade. While at Texas A&M he also played on the football team as a wide receiver. 

In 1999 he won a Pan American Games silver medal in the 400 metres and was on the U.S. team at the World Championships in Seville, running in the heats of the 4x400 metres.

McCray was an alternate for the 2000 Summer Olympics in Sydney.

References

External links

1974 births
Living people
American male sprinters
Texas A&M Aggies football players
Texas A&M Aggies men's track and field athletes
Competitors at the 1997 Summer Universiade
World Athletics Championships athletes for the United States
Pan American Games medalists in athletics (track and field)
Pan American Games silver medalists for the United States
Pan American Games bronze medalists for the United States
Athletes (track and field) at the 1999 Pan American Games
Medalists at the 1999 Pan American Games
American football wide receivers